Michael or Mike Caruso may refer to:

 Michael Caruso (editor), former editor-in-chief of the Smithsonian magazine who coined the term "elevator pitch"

Michael Caruso (ice hockey) (born 1988), Canadian professional ice hockey defenceman
Michael Caruso (musician) (born 1954), American Singer-Songwriter
Michael Caruso (racing driver) (born 1983), Australian professional racing driver
Mike Caruso (baseball) (born 1977), former Major League Baseball shortstop
Mike Caruso (politician) (born 1958), member of the Florida Legislature